Yakub Cemil (1883–1916) was an Ottoman revolutionary and soldier who assassinated Nazım Pasha during the 1913 Ottoman coup d'état. He was sentenced to death and executed in 1916.

References 

1883 births
1916 deaths
Military personnel from Istanbul
Revolutionaries from the Ottoman Empire
Turkish nationalists
Turkish assassins
Executed assassins
Members of the Special Organization (Ottoman Empire)
20th-century Ottoman military personnel
People executed by the Ottoman Empire by firing squad